Sha or SHA may refer to:

Places 
 Sha County, Fujian, China
 Shanghai Hongqiao International Airport, (IATA code)
 Sia, Cyprus, also spelled Sha
 Sagamihara Housing Area, an army installation in Japan
 Vehicle registration plates in the district Schwäbisch Hall and the town Schwäbisch Hall, Germany

People and language 
 Sha (surname)
 Sha (singer) (born 1979), German singer
 Sha Fei (1912–1950), Chinese photojournalist
 Sha language
 Sha (Cyrillic) (Ш, ш), a Cyrillic letter

Government and organizations 
 Maryland State Highway Administration
 Strategic health authorities, England
 Saskatchewan Hockey Association, now known as Hockey Saskatchewan
 Secondary Heads Association, now the Association of School and College Leaders
 Society for Historical Archaeology
 The Socialist Health Association, a  left-wing English medical association  affiliated with the Labour Party.

History

 Scriptores Historiae Augustae

Science and technology 
 Secure Hash Algorithms, SHA-0 to SHA-3
 Shorthand abstraction, a term presented in the 2007 book What Is Intelligence? by James R. Flynn
 Sidereal hour angle, in astronomy
 Intel SHA extensions
 Measure of material hardness using a Shore A type Shore durometer

Other uses 
 Sha (animal), the totemic animal of the Egyptian god Set
 Sha (comics), a French comic by Pat Mills
 Shareholders' agreement, or stockholders' agreement
 Stableford Handicap Adjustment, a component of the Golf Australia Handicap System

See also
 Sha Sha (album), by Ben Kweller
 Shah (disambiguation)
 Shaa (disambiguation)
 Shasha (disambiguation)